Tulip Cemetery is a historic cemetery in Tulip, a small hamlet in rural Dallas County, Arkansas.  It is located off Arkansas Highway 9, just behind the Tulip Methodist Church, occupying a high spot in the area.  Tulip was one of the first settlements in Dallas County; the cemetery's oldest documented grave dates to 1847.  It also includes the graves of six Confederate Army soldiers.

The cemetery was listed on the National Register of Historic Places in 1983.

See also
 National Register of Historic Places listings in Dallas County, Arkansas

References

Cemeteries on the National Register of Historic Places in Arkansas
Buildings and structures completed in 1842
Buildings and structures in Dallas County, Arkansas
National Register of Historic Places in Dallas County, Arkansas
Cemeteries established in the 1840s